Martha Woodmansee (born 1944) is an American professor at Case Western Reserve University in Cleveland, Ohio.  She has been a member of the  English department since 1986 and joined the faculty at the School of Law in 2003.  In addition, she was the Director of the Society for Critical Exchange, a national organization devoted to collaborative interdisciplinary work in theory.  In 2008 she has founded the International Society for the History and Theory of Intellectual Property. A 1999 Guggenheim fellow and 2004 Fulbright fellow, her teaching and research interests are 18th- and 19th-century literature, critical theory, cultural studies including book piracy and the emergence of international copyright during the nineteenth century.

Woodmansee attended Northwestern University (B.A.) and Stanford University (M.A., Ph.D).

Works

Author 
The Author, Art, and the Market: Rereading the History of Aesthetics. Columbia UP, 1994.

Editor
The New Economic Criticism: Studies at the Interface of Literature and Economics. Routledge, 1999.
The Construction of Authorship: Textual Appropriation in Law and Literature (co-edited with Peter Jaszi). Duke UP, 1994.  
Erkennen und Deuten. Essays zur Literatur und Literaturtheorie. Erich Schmidt, 1983.

Translator
Szondi, Peter. Introduction to Literary Hermeneutics. Cambridge UP, 1995.

External links 
Case Western Reserve University Department of English faculty profile
Case Western Reserve University School of Law faculty profile

1944 births
Living people
American academics of English literature
American legal scholars
Case Western Reserve University faculty
Copyright scholars
Literary critics of English
Northwestern University alumni
Stanford University alumni
Place of birth missing (living people)